The Buckingham & Winslow Advertiser is a weekly newspaper published in Aylesbury, Buckinghamshire, England, by JPIMedia. It covers the Buckingham and Winslow area. The editor is Hayley O'Keeffe. It is a member of the Independent Press Standards Organisation. It received its current name in 1984.

History
The Buckingham Advertiser was founded in 1853 and published by William Stallworthy. In 1856 it was renamed The Buckingham Advertiser and Winslow and Brackley Record. In 1862 it was renamed again to Buckingham Advertiser and Free Press. By 1877 the paper was covering Buckinghamshire, Oxfordshire, Northamptonshire and Bedfordshire. In 1885 its then owner Joseph Scrivener Ladd changed the name to Buckingham Advertiser and North Bucks Free Press.

References

External links 

Buckingham
Winslow, Buckinghamshire
Newspapers published in Buckinghamshire
Weekly newspapers published in the United Kingdom
Publications established in 1984
1984 establishments in England
Newspapers published by Johnston Press